In Greek mythology, Icarius (Ikários) was a Spartan king and a champion runner.

Family 
Icarius was the son of either Perieres and Gorgophone or of Oebalus and Bateia and thus brother of Hippocoon and Tyndareus. By Periboea, he became the father of Penelope, Perileos, Thoas, Damasippus, Imeusimus, Aletes and Iphthime.  According to other traditions, the mother of Penelope, Alyzeus and Leucadius was Polycaste, daughter of Lygaeus. 

His other possible wives were Dorodoche (daughter of Ortilochus) and Asterodia (daughter of Eurypylus); the latter was said to have born him five sons - Amasichus, Phalereus, Thoon, Pheremmelias, Perilaos - and a daughter Laodice or Laodamia. In some accounts, by Erymede, daughter of a son Damasiclus, he became the father of Elatus, father of Taenarus.

Mythology 
Icarius was a Spartan king and a champion runner who would not allow anyone to marry his daughter unless he beat him in a race. Odysseus succeeded and married Penelope. After they got married, Icarius tried to persuade Odysseus to remain in Sparta. He did leave with Penelope, but Icarius followed them, imploring his daughter to stay. Odysseus told her she must choose whether to be with her father or with her husband. Penelope did not answer, but modestly covered her face with a veil. Icarius correctly understood that this was a sign of her will to leave with Odysseus, let them go and erected a statue of Aidos (Modesty) on the spot. Icarius was apparently still alive at the time of the events of the Odyssey.

Notes

References 

 Apollodorus, The Library with an English Translation by Sir James George Frazer, F.B.A., F.R.S. in 2 Volumes, Cambridge, MA, Harvard University Press; London, William Heinemann Ltd. 1921. . Online version at the Perseus Digital Library. Greek text available from the same website.
Pausanias, Description of Greece with an English Translation by W.H.S. Jones, Litt.D., and H.A. Ormerod, M.A., in 4 Volumes. Cambridge, MA, Harvard University Press; London, William Heinemann Ltd. 1918. . Online version at the Perseus Digital Library
 Pausanias, Graeciae Descriptio. 3 vols. Leipzig, Teubner. 1903.  Greek text available at the Perseus Digital Library.
 Strabo, The Geography of Strabo. Edition by H.L. Jones. Cambridge, Mass.: Harvard University Press; London: William Heinemann, Ltd. 1924. Online version at the Perseus Digital Library.
 Strabo, Geographica edited by A. Meineke. Leipzig: Teubner. 1877. Greek text available at the Perseus Digital Library.

Princes in Greek mythology
Laconian characters in Greek mythology